Ease Down the Road is the seventh studio album by American musician Will Oldham, and the second under his moniker Bonnie 'Prince' Billy. It was released on Palace Records on March 19, 2001.

Domino Recording Company also released a UK limited edition 2-disc version of the album (Domino WIGCD89X). The bonus disc contains tracks taken from a BBC Peel Session first transmitted on March 16, 1999. The lineup includes Will Oldham, Mike Fellows, James Lo, and Matt Sweeney.

Critical reception

Nathan Bush of AllMusic gave the album 4 stars out of 5, saying: "Seeming more confident than ever, Oldham's Ease Down the Road is a wonderful addition to a catalog that should earn him a place among the finest songwriters of his age, or any age." Matt LeMay of Pitchfork gave the album a 7.9 out of 10, calling it "Oldham's most fleshed-out work to date" and "his most sonically diverse."

The Wire included it on the "2001 Rewind" list.

Track listing

Personnel
Credits adapted from liner notes.

 Todd Brashear – vocals, lap steel guitar
 Matt Everett – violin
 Mike Fellows – bass guitar
 Paul Greenlaw – vocals, banjo
 Catherine Irwin – vocals
 Harmony Korine – vocals
 Ned Oldham – vocals, guitar, bass guitar
 Will Oldham – vocals, guitar, Nord Lead, percussion
 David Pajo – vocals, guitar, bass guitar, Nord Lead, piano, percussion
 Bryan Rich – guitar
 Matt Sweeney – vocals, guitar, banjo
 Jon Theodore – drums, percussion

Charts

References

External links
 

2001 albums
Will Oldham albums
Domino Recording Company albums